Dale William  Mitchell (born April 21, 1958) is a Canadian former professional soccer striker who played for several North American teams in the 1980s and 1990s.

He made 55 appearances for the Canada national team and scored a then national record 19 goals. He coached the Canada national team from May 2007 until March 27, 2009. In 2012 as part of the Canadian Soccer Association's centennial celebration, he was named to the all-time Canada XI men's team. He was inducted into the Canadian Soccer Hall of Fame in 2002. In March 2014 it was announced that he would also be a 2014 inductee into the Indoor Soccer Hall of Fame.

Club career

Mitchell played in the former North American Soccer League. He began his professional career with the Vancouver Whitecaps (1977, 1978), then played for the Portland Timbers (1979 to 1982) and for the Montreal Manic (1983). He was an original player with the Vancouver 86ers of the Canadian Soccer League and American Professional Soccer League for whom he scored 37 goals during seasons from 1988 to 1990 and 1992 to 1994. He was with the Toronto Blizzard for the 1991 season.

Mitchell also played nine indoor soccer seasons in the old Major Indoor Soccer League with the Tacoma Stars, Kansas City Comets, and the Baltimore Blast. Mitchell finished as the league's third all-time goal scorer and fourth in total points with 406 goals and 280 assists for 686 points. He also played with the Toronto Blizzard.

International career
Mitchell made his senior debut for Canada in a September 15, 1980 friendly match against New Zealand in Vancouver (in which he scored two goals) and played his final international in a August 15, 1993 World Cup qualifier against Australia in Sydney. He represented Canada in 22 World Cup qualifiers and also played in the 1986 FIFA World Cup finals in Canada's third group stage match against the Soviet Union.

Mitchell also played every minute of Canada's matches at the 1984 Summer Olympics, scoring three goals including the equalizer when Canada took Brazil into extra time and eventually penalty kicks in the quarterfinals.

International goals
Scores and results list Canada's goal tally first.

Managerial career
Following his retirement as a player, Mitchell coached the 86ers reserves squad and was first-team assistant coach from 1995 to 1999. He succeeded Carl Valentine as the club's head coach in 1999 when the club was renamed the Vancouver Whitecaps. From 2001 to 2007, Mitchell was Canada's Under-20 national team head coach. In 2004, he served as an assistant coach to Frank Yallop with the senior national team during FIFA World Cup Qualifiers. In May 2007, he was appointed head coach of the Canadian men's senior team. In 2008, Canada did not progress beyond CONCACAF Stage III of the FIFA World Cup Qualifiers, finishing in the so-called CONCACAF Group of Death behind the higher-ranked Mexican and Honduran teams. Mitchell was relieved of his duties on March 27, 2009.

References

External links
 / Canada Soccer Hall of Fame
 
 Dale Mitchell stats

1958 births
Living people
Soccer players from Vancouver
Canadian people of British descent
Association football forwards
Canada men's national soccer team managers
Canadian soccer players
Canada men's international soccer players
Olympic soccer players of Canada
Canadian expatriate soccer players
Canadian expatriate sportspeople in the United States
Expatriate soccer players in the United States
Footballers at the 1984 Summer Olympics
1986 FIFA World Cup players
1991 CONCACAF Gold Cup players
Vancouver Whitecaps (1974–1984) players
Portland Timbers (1975–1982) players
Montreal Manic players
Tacoma Stars players
Kansas City Comets (original MISL) players
Baltimore Blast (1980–1992) players
Vancouver Whitecaps (1986–2010) players
Toronto Blizzard (1986–1993) players
North American Soccer League (1968–1984) players
North American Soccer League (1968–1984) indoor players
American Professional Soccer League players
Major Indoor Soccer League (1978–1992) players
Canadian Soccer League (1987–1992) players
A-League (1995–2004) players
Canadian soccer coaches
Vancouver Whitecaps (1986–2010) coaches
Canada Soccer Hall of Fame inductees
Canada men's youth international soccer players
Canada men's under-23 international soccer players
CONCACAF Championship-winning players